Ruby Button is a fictional character from the British Channel 4 soap opera Hollyoaks, played by Anna Shaffer. Shaffer's casting was announced in December 2010 and it was revealed that Ruby would be introduced as the sister of Duncan Button (Dean Aspen). Shaffer originally auditioned for the role of Leanne Holiday, in which she was not successful. Shaffer began filming her scenes in late 2010 and relocated to Liverpool for filming. Ruby made her first appearance in the episode broadcast on 3 January 2011. In October 2013, it was announced that Shaffer had quit the role and would leave in February 2014. In October 2017, speculation emerged indicating Shaffer was to reprise the role very soon and on 16 November 2017, it was confirmed that Ruby would be back for Frankie Osborne's funeral later that month. She returned on 23 November 2017, departing in the following episode, broadcast on 24 November 2017. She made another return for a guest stint at the end of April 2018, making her final appearance on 30 April.

Ruby was initially described as "sneaky" and likely to cause mayhem at Duncan's expense. Ruby is a tearaway and "occupies herself with tormenting others" including her best friend, Esther Bloom (Jazmine Franks). Ruby is illiterate and the official Hollyoaks website describe this as her "Achilles heel". However, Ruby does not let her illiteracy stop her causing trouble. The character has also been called a "bitchy schoolgirl" and sharp-tongued. Series producer, Emma Smithwick, said she wants the character of Ruby to be "more full and not two-dimensional".

Ruby's storylines have often focused on her various relationships and "bitchy" ways. Ruby engages in a brief relationship with Duncan's best friend, Ricky Campbell (Ashley Margolis), which ends when Ricky sees Ruby bullying others. Ruby also becomes best friends with Esther and Sinead O'Connor (Stephanie Davis). A prominent storyline for Ruby saw her reveal her illiteracy and subsequently develop feelings for her tutor, Pete Hamill (Peter Mitchell). Ruby's behaviour soon begins to "spiral out of control" and she claims to have had sex with older man, Riley Costello (Rob Norbury). She later embarks on a relationships with Jono (Dylan Llewellyn) and Ziggy Roscoe (Fabrizio Santino), and becomes embroiled in the bullying of Esther as well as suffering a heart attack.

Development

Casting and characterisation

In December 2010, the Liverpool Echo reported that eighteen-year-old Shaffer would be joining the cast of Hollyoaks as Ruby, the sister of Duncan Button (Dean Aspen). Shaffer originally auditioned for the role of Leanne Holiday, but she was later cast as Ruby. Shaffer relocated to Liverpool, where Hollyoaks is filmed, for the role. She began filming her scenes in late 2010. Shaffer made her first on-screen appearance as Ruby in the episode broadcast on 3 January 2011. In May 2011, it was speculated that Shaffer would be leaving Hollyoaks. However, this was denied and a show spokesperson told Digital Spy "We don't want to spoil the storylines for the viewers, however we can confirm that Anna Shaffer is with Hollyoaks for the foreseeable future."

Ruby was initially described as "sneaky" and likely to "cause mayhem at the expense of [Duncan]". The official Hollyoaks website described Ruby as a "tearaway". They dubbed her the "Rubester" and said she "occupies herself with tormenting others" including her best friend, Esther Bloom (Jazmine Franks). Ruby is illiterate, which is her "Achilles heel". However, she does not let her illiteracy stop her causing trouble. Digital Spy called Ruby a "bitchy schoolgirl" who is sharp-tongued. Series producer, Emma Smithwick, said she wants the character of Ruby to be "more full and not two-dimensional". Shaffer told OK Extra that Ruby is a "tart with a heart", but finds it hard to trust people. She said "[Ruby] has deep-seated insecurities and she feels quite lonely."

Illiteracy and school girl crush
In May 2011, it was revealed that Ruby is illiterate. Ruby gets her friend, Sinead O'Connor (Stephanie Davis) to write a love letter from their friend, Esther Bloom (Jazmine Franks), to teaching assistant, Amy Barnes (Ashley Slanina-Davies). Shaffer told a columnist from Inside Soap that Ruby and Sinead "come up with all this ridiculous, over-the-top stuff" and put up copies of the letter around school. Amy discovers what Ruby and Sinead have done and asks them to write apology letters to Esther. Shaffer explained that Ruby seems worried and does everything she can to get out of writing the letter. Explaining the situation, Shaffer told Inside Soap [...] "Sinead realises that it's not because Ruby doesn't want to write the letter - it's because she can't". Esther discovers Ruby's illiteracy and decides to help. Esther's grandmother, Frankie Osborne (Helen Pearson), learns of Ruby's treatment of Esther and threatens to throw her out. However, Esther convinces Frankie to let Ruby stay when she reveals her illiteracy. Esther also tells their school headteacher, Pete Hamill (Peter Mitchell). Shaffer opined that Ruby is grateful to Esther as Ruby "wouldn't have the guts". The actress added that it was "nice" to see Ruby's vulnerability, but said it would not last.

Pete organises a tutor, Colin Grimshaw (Michael Mears), to teach Ruby to read and write. Ruby assumes that Pete will be tutoring her. She has feelings for him and thinks they are reciprocated. Shaffer said that Ruby is "gutted" when she learns that Colin will be tutoring her. Ruby tries to make their lessons "as difficult as possible". The other students post a photo of Ruby and Colin inside a love heart on the classroom board which leaves Ruby "absolutely mortified". Shaffer opined that people may sympathise with Ruby. She said "Instead of thinking about what a bitch [Ruby] is, the viewers might start to realise that she's actually just a lost little girl." Ruby "winds up" Colin in their lessons and she does not think that he will retaliate. Ruby tells Pete that Colin touched her inappropriately. However, Pete convinces Ruby that Colin was only trying to comfort her. Pete tells Ruby that Colin will continue to tutor her. Ruby verbally abuses Colin and he slaps her. Pete sees this and suspends Colin. Ruby uses the situation to her advantage and "revels" in the attention. Pete then offers to be Ruby's new tutor. In August 2011, Ruby kisses Pete during one of their study sessions. Ruby kisses Pete after she accidentally spills a drink on him. Shaffer said that Ruby and Pete are "physically close" and she decides to be spontaneous. Pete is "horrified" and rebuffs her advances. Shaffer revealed that Ruby is hurt by this as she had convinced herself that her feelings were reciprocated by Pete. He then tells her that he is going to find a replacement tutor.

Rebellious behaviour
In May 2011, it was reported that she would soon "spiral out of control". Ruby plans to host a party as Frankie and Jack Osborne (Jimmy McKenna) are on holiday. However, Jack asks his son, Darren (Ashley Taylor Dawson) and Darren's girlfriend, Nancy Hayton (Jessica Fox), to babysit Ruby whilst they are away. Darren and Nancy discover Ruby's plans and put a stop to them. Shaffer explained that Ruby sees Frankie and Jack being away as the "perfect" opportunity to make some mischief. However, Ruby underestimates Nancy, who poses as her on a social networking website and cancels the party. Ruby is "furious" and decides to run away. She stands "sexily" at the side of the road trying to hitch a lift out of the village. Ruby is pleased when Riley Costello (Rob Norbury) and Doug Carter (PJ Brennan) offer her a lift and she introduces herself as Alicia. She then joins them on their night out. Doug flirts with Ruby and Shaffer said that "Ruby being Ruby then thinks it would be a good idea to head back to his flat". Ruby and Doug kiss, but she passes out as she is not used to drinking "so much" alcohol. Doug decides to take her home and looks for her mobile phone to call one of her friends. However, he finds her student identification and discovers her real age. Doug tells Riley and as they panic, Ruby wakes up and realises that they are talking about her. She "freaks out" and unable to find her own top, takes Riley's football training top before secretly leaving. Doug and Riley are "frantic" when they realise Ruby has gone. They later find her "worse for wear" and covered in her own sick. They return her home to Frankie after getting their story straight. Later, Ruby realises who the training top belongs to and Shaffer said that she sees it as an opportunity to cause more trouble. Ruby lies to Esther, telling her that she had sex with Riley.

Of Ruby's lie, a Hollyoaks insider told the Daily Star "As far as [Riley and Doug are] concerned that's the end of it. But for Ruby the fun has just begun." They added that Ruby is "one seriously mixed-up girl" and it is not long before her lie begins to spread. Ruby tells her friends that she had sex with Riley and the rumour begins to spread around the village. Riley's fiancé, Mercedes McQueen (Jennifer Metcalfe), hears the rumour and is angry with Ruby. The Daily Star reported that Ruby is left "red-faced" after Mercedes confronts her. Mercedes tells Ruby that she must confess to making the lie up.

Relationship with Jono
In December 2011, it was announced that Ruby would begin a relationship with Jono (Dylan Llewellyn). Jono attends Ruby's sixteenth birthday party and the other guests do not arrive. Shaffer said that Ruby is "over the moon" with Jono's presence. Ruby sees Jono as a "cool sixth-former" and she asks him out. Jono accepts and they enjoy a romantic evening at the cinema. However, they are both nervous and Shaffer said that Ruby is anxious and has "first date jitters". Shaffer explained that Jono's worries are caused by his lack of experience with women. The actress called Ruby and Jono's encounter "awkward yet very sweet". Shaffer added that the storyline would see a "nicer side" of Ruby emerge, which she opined was great. She said "We're going to see their relationship blossom - it'll be a rocky ride, but I've got my fingers crossed!". The official Hollyoaks website referred to the couple by the portmanteau "Juby".

The pair continue to see each other and their relationship becomes serious. Shaffer told a writer from Inside Soap that Ruby has "really fallen for Jono" and that while they have had their share of problems - a "proper attraction" remains between them. However, Jono is embarrassed because Ruby is still in school; Shaffer explained that he ensures that their dates happen when no one else is present. He does like her, but "it is taking a while to get there". Ruby is sure of what she wants and she invites him over for sex - but their encounter causes them to feel more awkward around one another. Shaffer added that Ruby and Jono's romance would continue to develop over time and said that it would have plenty of "drama in store for both of them".

Departure
On 31 October 2013, it was confirmed that Shaffer had decided to leave Hollyoaks. A show spokesperson revealed that Shaffer's final scenes as Ruby will air in early 2014. It was also confirmed that Ruby's on-off relationship with Ziggy Roscoe (Fabrizio Santino) would face "more twists and turns" in the following weeks. In her later storylines, Ruby bought cocaine from Trevor Royle (Greg Wood) and suffered a heart attack after taking it.

Storylines

Ruby arrives in Hollyoaks village to stay with her brother, Duncan Button, after leaving home. Duncan allows Ruby to move in with him. Bart McQueen (Jonny Clarke) tries to impress Ruby by stealing a car and taking her joyriding. Bart hits Jason Costello (Victoria Atkin) and he and Ruby flee the scene. Ruby begins dating Duncan's best friend, Ricky Campbell (Ashley Margolis). Ricky ends the relationship after he sees Ruby bullying a younger pupil at school. In retaliation, Ruby attempts to get Ricky expelled from school, but ultimately fails. Ruby gets her friend, Sinead O'Connor, to write a love letter from their friend, Esther Bloom, to teaching assistant, Amy Barnes. Amy discovers that Ruby and Sinead wrote the letter and as punishment, asks them to write apology letters to Esther. Ruby refuses and admits that she is illiterate. Ruby explains that her parents obsession with fame caused her illiteracy. Esther reveals Ruby's illiteracy to school headmaster, Pete Hamill, who offers to help Ruby. Ruby develops an attraction to Pete.

Colin Grimshaw begins tutoring Ruby to read and write. Ruby falsely claims that Colin touched her inappropriately. Pete convinces Ruby that Colin was only trying to comfort her. In their next tutoring session, Ruby brands Colin a pervert and he slaps her. Pete sees this and suspends Colin. Pete offers to be Ruby's new tutor, which she accepts. Ruby plans a house party when her legal guardians, Frankie and Jack Osborne go on vacation. Jack asks his son, Darren, and Darren's girlfriend, Nancy Hayton, to babysit Ruby whilst they are away. Nancy foils Ruby's plans and secretly cancels the party. Upon discovering this, Ruby argues with Nancy and decides to run away. Whilst trying to hitch a lift out of the village, Ruby meets Riley Costello and Doug Carter and introduces herself as Alicia. She joins them on their night out and becomes intoxicated. Ruby goes home with Doug and they passionately kiss, but she falls asleep. Doug discovers Ruby's real age and calls Riley. Ruby wakes up and hears them discussing her. She takes Riley's football training top as she is unable to find her own top and sneaks out. Doug and Riley find Ruby and return her home. Ruby lies to Esther, telling her that she and Riley had sex. Riley's fiancé, Mercedes McQueen, confronts Ruby and tells her to stop spreading lies about Riley.

After Sinead and Bart McQueen complete their GCSE exams, her and Esther accompany the couple to Abersoch for a holiday after lying to Jack and Frankie about where they were really going. While there Ruby meets Bart's old friends Tilly Evans, Maddie Morrison and Jono. Jono then attempts to sleep with Ruby in order to lose his virginity, but is shot down by Ruby. After Sinead is hospitalized after almost drowning while drunk, Ruby forms a plan to sneak her and Esther back on a bus to Hollyoaks, without anyone finding out they were at Abersoch. The plan is a success and Sinead promises she won't tell anyone the two were there. Ruby and Esther then have a heart to heart about the places in the Osborne family and comfort each other by saying even if the family doesn't fully accept them, they'll always have each other and that's what matters.

Nancy stops Ruby flirting with Pete, leaving Ruby angry. Ruby hears Pete offering to give Nancy a reference for a new job. Ruby steals Pete's mobile phone and when Nancy's interviewer calls for the reference, Ruby criticises Nancy. Nancy fails to secure the job. Darren learns of Ruby's deception and gives Ruby a fake letter which explains that she has been suspended from school. Darren reveals the letter is fake and Ruby apologizes to Nancy. Ruby kisses Pete during one of their tutoring sessions. Pete rejects Ruby's advances and tells her he can no longer tutor her. Ruby steals money from Jack and frames Danny Lawrence, but she later confesses.

Ruby starts a relationship with Jono after he attends her 16th birthday party. The first time they sleep together is cut short when Jono doesn't last long causing awkwardness between the pair, however they make-up and sleep together again to correct it. Ruby then wants their relationship to become official but Jono feels ashamed to be dating a school girl after Maddie Morrison (Scarlett Bowman) manipulates him. He them humiliates her at a party, so she dumps him. He manages to convince her to give him another chance and attempts to keep their relationship quiet, but Ruby soon finds out he fears he'll be embarrassed by his friends if they find out and breaks up with him. On Valentine's Day, Ruby serves as a bridesmaid along with Esther for Darren and Nancy's wedding. Jono attempts to talk to her during the ceremony but she rebukes him, still hurt by the way he treated her. Later at Sinead's party he manages to win her back by kissing her in front of his friends, showing he doesn't care what they think and that he truly wants to be with her.

Ruby attends a night out with her friends and Maddie gives her marijuana to smoke. Ruby is grounded by Jack and Maddie continues to alienate everyone against Ruby. Maddie later befriends Ruby. Soon after, Maddie begins bullying Esther with the help of Sinead and Ruby.

Jono plans to join the army, upsetting Ruby who declares she still has romantic feelings for him and Jono reveals that he feels the same. They then get back together and Jono realizes that if he joins the army he'll have to leave her behind. Jono then proposes to her so that she can come with him to the army to live in the couple's quarters. Ruby accepts and they plan to marry. Frankie and Jack tell them they will not allow Ruby to marry Jono. They plan to elope to Gretna Green. Maddie steals a van to transport them to Gretna Green but is followed by Bart and Esther who plan to stop the marriage. Maddie is distracted from the road and does not see Leah Barnes (Ela-May Demirican). Maddie swerves to avoid Leah and drives through the wedding venue of Doug Carter (PJ Brennan), Ste Hay (Kieron Richardson), Cindy Cunningham (Stephanie Waring) and Tony Hutchinson (Nick Pickard). Jono saves Ruby from the wreckage, but she is horrified when both Neil and Maddie are killed. Ruby mourns their deaths and she and Jono begin planning her wedding. While sitting outside, Ruby holds Jono but is devastated to realise that he has died in her arms from internal injuries. Ruby, Sinead and Bart then act as a friend to Esther, but this is only to prevent her from talking to the police about the crash. Ruby tells a worried Sinead that if Esther does confess to the police she will wish she was dead. Ruby and Sinead's bullying worsens against Esther and when she tells the police Bart was involved in the crash, which causes Bart to leave Hollyoaks, the bullying pair worsen their treatment of Esther.

Ruby takes over a lead in the bullying, purposely turning Esther's family against her. Esther starts to feel like everyone is against her which leads to her attempting to commit suicide with her needing a new liver. However, Ruby and Sinead show no sympathy whatsoever and make a pact to agree they say they had nothing to do with the bullying. But gradually, Ruby starts to get wracked with guilt over the bullying and finally confesses to Esther's family that they are the bullies. But at the same time, Sinead's stepmother Diane O'Connor (Alex Fletcher) questions Sinead over her involvement in the bullying in which she denies being involved. Next day after the confession, Jack furiously kicks Ruby out of the family home, forbidding her from going to see Esther and declaring her as no longer part of the family. After this, Ruby finds herself on the streets all day consumed by guilt. Later in the evening, she goes to Sinead's house and confesses to Diane that she and Sinead are the reason why Esther nearly killed herself. However, Diane furiously tells her to leave. She is then chased by John Paul McQueen who tries to talk to her, but she is then accidentally hit by Jack's car. Ruby is then taken to hospital and survives purely. However, Jack feels no sympathy for her because of her bullying Esther. She then returns home on Frankie's orders, but Frankie and the rest of the family assure her that she will punished. Next day, at a gathering at The Dog, Frankie gets into an argument with Diane, who's with Sinead, about Sinead's involvement. Diane, now fully aware of Sinead's involvement of the bullying, tries to blame the whole thing on Ruby, but Ruby reveals the whole truth by showing Dylan Shaw's (Mikey Riddington-Smith) video of Esther's message, in front of everyone, including new college headmaster Patrick Blake (Jeremy Sheffield). A few days later, Patrick calls both Ruby and Sinead into his office at different times. A remorseful Ruby apologizes sincerely for what she did, but is suspended from college for a few weeks. Sinead meanwhile shows no remorse and subsequently gets excluded.

A few weeks later, Ruby ends her friendship with Sinead and returns to college. Shortly after she returns, Patrick asks John Paul to help Ruby with an anti-bullying campaign and also has Phoebe Jackson (Mandip Gill) help her, although Phoebe is still angry with her for bullying Esther.  Ruby forgives Esther, along with Sinead, after they discover that it was Brendan Brady who blackmail at her to bring Bart McQueen and Joel down. In August, after much flirting, Ruby finally kisses Ziggy Roscoe (Fabrizio Santino) and they begin a relationship. Despite their new relationship, an upset Frankie sleeps with Ziggy leaving Ruby heartbroken. She tries to tell Jack of Frankie's affair but he doesn't believe her. An upset Ruby purchases cocaine off Trevor and steals alcohol from the dog and has her own party leading her to have a heart attack.

Ruby is soon discharged from hospital following her heart attack and goes to live back at The Dog in the Pond. Ruby plans to propose to Ziggy however as he doesn't return home after a night out, presumes he has slept with someone else when he was just taking care of Leela Lomax (Kirsty-Leigh Porter) who was exceptionally drunk. Ruby finds Frankie asleep on the couch and presumes she was with Ziggy so chops her hair as revenge. When Ruby realizes the truth, she feels guilty and makes plans to leave the village. Ziggy begs her not to however Esther helps pack her bags and she leaves to stay with her brother in Spain.

In 2016, Jack told Darren that Esther has gone to stay with Ruby to keep her safe from the hands of the Gloved Hand Killer. In August, Esther sent her wedding invitation to Ruby, but found out that she couldn't attend. After her wife Kim left her, she went to visit Ruby for four days, and upon her return to the village, Esther mentions to her grandmother that Ruby and her brother were doing fine,  Ruby got a good job in Spain and had learned how to speak Spanish. In December, Kim called Ruby to tell her that Esther had been shot.

2017-2018
In November 2017, Ruby returns to the village for Frankie's funeral. She boasts about how good her life is to the Osbornes. At the wake, she tries to kiss Luke Morgan (Gary Lucy) but he rejects her. The wake descends into chaos and Esther storms off. Ruby comforts her and admits that her life isn't as good as she said it was. She offers Esther a chance to go to Spain with her and run a bar and Esther agrees. However, Esther decides to stay in Hollyoaks and Ruby returns to Spain alone.

In April 2018, Ruby returns to the village again after Esther is almost killed by Darcy Wilde (Aisling Jarrett-Gavin). Esther decides to move to Spain with Ruby and takes her up on Ruby's offer to help run the bar. She also decides not to tell Jack but Jack catches her and they argue. Ruby helps them make up and they head to The Hutch to say goodbye to the Osbornes. They get into the taxi and find a large sum of money that was given to them by Grace Black (Tamara Wall). Ruby and Esther then leave Hollyoaks for Spain.

Reception
In August 2011, Inside Soap conducted a poll to find out which Hollyoaks character reader's most wanted to be murdered by serial killer, Silas Blissett (Jeff Rawle). Ruby came second, receiving 21% of the vote. Smithwick told Digital Spy that she "really like[s]" Shaffer. Sarah Ellis of Inside Soap said that Jono was a bad boyfriend to Ruby and that she should have ended their relationship.

References

External links
 Character profile at the Official Hollyoaks website

Hollyoaks characters
Television characters introduced in 2011
Fictional bullies
Female characters in television